Lakin Brook is a river in Delaware County, New York. It drains Pierce Pond and flows west, then turns north, then west again before converging with Peas Eddy Brook east-southeast of Peas Eddy.

References

Rivers of New York (state)
Rivers of Delaware County, New York